Candi Kethek, is a terraced megalithic pyramid shaped 15th-16th century Hindu temple on the northwest slope of Mount Lawu in Anggrasmanis village of Gumeng subdistrict in Jenawi district of Karanganyar Regency in Central Java of Indonesia. Temple has seven terraces facing west, each terrace is connected by stone steps. There is an alternative path to the top terrace on the south side. Kethek Temple is located northeast of fifteenth-century Javanese-Hindu Ceto Temple. To reach Candi Kethek, visitors must take a 300 m footpath from Ceto Temple in the direction of the path leading to Puri Taman Saraswati.

Etymology

Kethek in Javanese means monkey, the name given by local residents to this temple because there used to be many monkeys in this area. Candi means Hindu temple built during the Zaman Hindu-Buddha or "Hindu-Buddhist period", between the 4th and 15th centuries.

History

The existence of this temple has been reported since 1842. In 2005, excavations were carried out by the Central Java Archaeological Heritage Preservation Agency in collaboration with the Department of Archeology of Gadjah Mada University and the Karanganyar Regency Government. A statue of tortoise, incarnation of Hindu deity Lord Vishnu, denoting Samudramanthana, was found on the lowest terrace, which confirmed that Candi Kethek is a Hindu place of worship. Research on the Kethek Temple is still ongoing to obtain more information history of the temple by studying the layout of the temple, and inscriptions and artifacts found at the site.

Architecture
This temple is similar to the Ceto temple and 15th-century Javanese-Hindu Sukuh temple (candi) found in this area on the terraces, all of which are considered to be the hallmark of Megalith cultural heritage buildings in the archipelago. Based on this similarity, the time of Candi Kathek's establishmentwas estimated to be almost the same as the other two temples, i.e. around the 15th to 16th centuries CE.

On the first terrace of the temple, there is a building on the northeast side. The second and third terraces each have two buildings on the north and south sides. Whereas the fourth terrace, the top terrace, is thought to be the site of the main temple building, which is now has a small "stana" with a golden crown, clad in Balinese Poleng Fabric.

See also

 Pyramid temples in Indonesia
 Gunung Padang Megalithic Site, 5 terraces
 Lebak Cibedug, 9 terraces
 Pugung Raharjo, 5 terraces
 Candi Sukuh, 3 terraces

 Related topics in Java
 Candi Ceto
 Candi of Indonesia
 Prambanan Temple, 6th-9th century UNESCO heritage Hindu temple in Central Java.
 Sunda Kingdom, 7th-16th century Indianised Hindu kingdom in Western and Central Java.
 Taruma Kingdom, 2nd-6th century Indianised Hindu kingdom of Western Java. 

 Other related topics 
 Greater India
 Indianisation
 History of Indian influence on Southeast Asia
 Hinduism in Indonesia
 Buddhism in Indonesia
 List of places with columnar jointed volcanics

References

External links

Javanese culture
Cultural Properties of Indonesia
Tourist attractions in Central Java
Archaeological sites in Indonesia

Places in Hindu worship
History of Central Java
Archaeology of Indonesia